Federico Rampini (born 25 March 1956) is an Italian journalist, writer, and lecturer who holds both Italian and American citizenship. He served as deputy editor of Il Sole 24 Ore, and has worked as chief foreign correspondent for La Repubblica since 1997. He has been residing in the United States since 2000. He is the 2019 recipient of the Ernest Hemingway Prize.

Early life, education, and family
Rampini was born in Genoa, Italy, on 25 March 1956, and was raised in Brussels due to his father's work at the European Commission. He attended the European School, Brussels I, where he earned a European Baccalaureate. He then attended Bocconi University in Milan, where he spent four years studying political economy. Subsequently, he attended the Sapienza University of Rome, where his contemporaries included, amongst others, Mario Draghi. He would also attend seminars of the French liberal sociologist Raymond Aron at the École pratique des hautes études in Paris. He was a member of the Italian Communist Party from 1974 to 1984.

Rampini is married to Stefania, with whom he has two children, actor Jacopo Rampini and Costanza Rampini a university professor. He has lived in the United States since 2000, and became a US citizen in 2014.

Career
Rampini's activity as a journalist began in 1977 for Città futura, a weekly magazine of the Italian Communist Youth Federation (FGCI) whose secretary at the time was Massimo D’Alema. From 1979 to 1982 he worked as the economic-union editor for the PCI weekly Rinascita. In 1982 Rampini moved to  Mondo Economico  (weekly of Il Sole 24 Ore) then to  L'Espresso  (1982–1986). Rampini worked for  Il Sole 24 Ore  as correspondent from France for five years (1986–1991) and later as deputy director (1991–1995). Since 1995 he has been working for La Repubblica, first at the head of the Milanese editorial staff, then as foreign correspondent from Brussels (1997–2000), San Francisco (2000–2004), Beijing (2004–2009), and since 2009 from New York City. Rampini often reports on top-level international summits such as the G-8, G-20, and the World Economic Forum in Davos; he also reports from the White House as he holds press accreditation from the Presidency of the United States of America.

Rampini, who is a prolific non-fiction writer and essayist, has written over 30 books, most of which are published by Mondadori and have been translated into several languages. In 2005, his book Il Secolo Cinese -"The Chinese Century", topped the Italian bestseller charts in non-fiction for several months and is now in its sixteenth edition. His 2006 book L'Impero di Cindia – "The Chindia Empire: China, India and Their Surroundings" (Mondadori), sold over 100,000 copies.

Rampini was named among the fifty most influential personalities in Europe in 2005 by the European Voice poll EV50. He has been a visiting professor at the University of California Berkeley School of Journalism, Bocconi University in Milan, and at the Shanghai University of Economics and Finance.

Rampini was accused in early 2015, among others by translator Marion Sarah Tuggey, of having based one of his articles on translations and reductions of articles and reports from newspapers such as the New York Times and the Financial Times. Among these, an interview with Vandana Shiva, which would have been produced through partial translation and readjustment of a blog post on Shiva's website. 
To illustrate such cases of plagiarism, Tuggey and others used the hashtag #rampinomics.

Awards
 Premio Acqui Storia , 2005
 Premio Luigi Barzini , 2005
 Premio Saint Vincent, 2006
 Premio Hemingway (2019)

Books

 La comunicazione aziendale. All'interno dell'impresa, nel contesto sociale, nel quadro europeo, Milano, ETAS libri, 1990, 
 Il crack delle nostre pensioni, Milano, Rizzoli, 1994, .
 Imprenditori italiani nel mondo. Ieri e oggi, con Duccio Bigazzi (a cura di), Milano, Libri Scheiwiller, 1996, .
 Germanizzazione. Come cambierà l'Italia, Roma, Laterza, 1996, .
 Kosovo. Gli italiani e la guerra, intervista a Massimo D'Alema, Milano, Mondadori, 1999, .
 Per adesso. Intervista con Carlo De Benedetti, Milano, Longanesi, 1999, .
 New economy. Una rivoluzione in corso, Roma, Laterza, 2000, .
 Dall'euforia al crollo. La seconda vita della new economy, Roma, Laterza, 2001, .
 Effetto euro, Milano, Longanesi, 2002, .
 Le paure dell'America, Collana I Robinson.Letture, Milano, Longanesi, 2003, .
 San Francisco-Milano, Collana Contromano, Roma, Laterza, Laterza 2004, .
 Tutti gli uomini del presidente. George W. Bush e la nuova destra americana, Collana Le sfere, Roma, Carocci, 2004, .
 Il secolo cinese. Storie di uomini, città e denaro dalla fabbrica del mondo, Milano, Mondadori, 2005, .
 L'impero di Cindia. Cina, India e dintorni: la superpotenza asiatica da tre miliardi e mezzo di persone, Collana Strade blu, Milano, Mondadori, 2006, .
 L'ombra di Mao. Sulle tracce del grande timoniere per capire il presente di Cina, Tibet, Corea del Nord e il futuro del mondo, Milano, Mondadori, 2006, .
 La speranza indiana. Storie di uomini, città e denaro dalla più grande democrazia del mondo, Collana Strade blu, Milano, Mondadori 2007, .
 Centomila punture di spillo. Come l'Italia può tornare a correre, con Carlo De Benedetti e Francesco Daveri, Collana Strade blu, Milano, Mondadori 2008, .
 Con gli occhi dell'Oriente, Milano, A. Mondadori scuola, 2009.
 Le dieci cose che non-saranno più le stesse. Tutto quello che la crisi sta cambiando, Roma, Gruppo editoriale L'Espresso, 2009.
 Slow Economy. Rinascere con saggezza. Tutto quello che noi occidentali possiamo imparare dall'Oriente, Collana Strade blu, Milano, Mondadori 2009. .
 Occidente estremo. Il nostro futuro tra l'ascesa dell'impero cinese e il declino della potenza americana, Collana Strade blu, Milano, Mondadori 2010.

References

1956 births
Living people
Italian journalists
Italian male journalists
Italian male writers
21st-century Italian writers
Alumni of the European Schools
La Repubblica people